Red sky at night or Red Sky at Night may refer to:
An example of weather lore; see Red sky at morning
"Red Sky at Night", a song by David Gilmour from the album On an Island
"Red Sky at Night", a song by Focus from the album Ship of Memories
 Red Sky at Night (play), 2022 play by Lindsay Rodden for Mikron Theatre Company

See also 
Red Sky at Morning (disambiguation)
"Red Skies", a 1982 song by The Fixx